An artificial cardiac pacemaker is a medical device that regulates the beating of the heart.

Pacemaker may also refer to:

Medicine
 Biological pacemaker, the use of specialized cells to improve the regulation of the heart
 Brain pacemaker, a device to treat movement disorders, epilepsy, depression, or other conditions
 Cardiac pacemaker, cells within the heart that initiate contractions and set the pace of beating
 Diaphragmatic pacemaker, a device used to help patients breathe through pacing of the diaphragm

Other uses
 Pacemaker (running), a runner who enters a race to set a fast pace for other competitors
 Pacemaker (film), a 2012 South Korean film
 The Pacemaker, a pocket-sized DJ system
 National Pacemaker Awards, American awards for excellence in student journalism
 Pacemaker (software), a high-availability cluster resource manager
 Pacemaker (train), an American passenger train
 Pacemaker Entertainment, a Canadian record label, part of the Canadian Independent Record Production Association
 Pacemaker, a fictional talk-radio program Public Liberty Radio station in the Grand Theft Auto IV game soundtrack

See also 
The Pacemakers (disambiguation)
Paceman (disambiguation)